The Grillo telephone was manufactured in Italy by Italtel (then a subsidiary of Società Italiana Telecomunicazioni) for Società Italiana per l'Esercizio delle Telecomunicazioni, a former state-owned telecommunications company which is now part of Telecom Italia. "Grillo" was introduced in 1967 and remained in production until 1979.

Design 
The modern styling, compact form factor, and automatically opening clamshell design set "Grillo" apart from other telephones that were available at the time. Innovative features that contributed to the phone's compact size include a dial that replaced the conventional rotary finger stop mechanism with a button in each of the number holes which, when actioned, pushed a pin through the back of the dial to stop the mechanism in its correct position. The incorporation of the ringer mechanism into the wall plug rather than the phone itself, and the use of a thin ABS plastic shell also helped reduce both its size and weight.  The name "Grillo", which means cricket in Italian, was chosen because the phone's ringer sounded like a cricket. 

"Grillo" was designed in 1965 by Richard Sapper and Marco Zanuso, who, as a team, also collaborated with Italian companies such as Brionvega, Gavina, Kartell, and Alfa Romeo throughout the 1960s and 1970s. The design was awarded the 1967 Compasso d'oro in Milan and the Gold Medal at the 1968 Ljubljna Biennale of Design (BIO3).

The "Grillo" would subsequently influence the design of "flip phone" mobile telephones developed during the 1990s like the Motorola StarTAC and RAZR, as well other electronic devices such as portable computers and games.

In popular culture
The "Grillo" telephone appears in multiple episodes of the original 1960s Mission Impossible television series.

Patrizia Reggiani (played by Lady Gaga) uses a "Grillo" telephone in the 2021 film House of Gucci.

Also see
 Communicator (Star Trek)
 Ericofon
 Trimphone
 Motorola StarTAC
 Motorola RAZR
 Telecommunications collection, Museum of Science and Technology, Milan

References

External links
 Grillo Telephone at the Museum of Modern Art
 Grillo Telephone at the Centre Pompidou
 Grillo Telephone at the ADI Design Museum
 Grillo Telephone at the Israel Museum
 Grillo Telephone at the Cooper Hewitt Smithsonian Design Museum

Telephony equipment
Industrial design
Product design
Italian design
Compasso d'Oro Award recipients